The Clark Planetarium is a planetarium and science museum situated within The Gateway at the intersection of 400 West and 100 South in downtown Salt Lake City, Utah, United States. The Clark Planetarium opened in April 2003, replacing the historic Hansen Planetarium under a grant from the Clark Foundation in cooperation with Salt Lake County.

Hansen Dome Theater
This theater is the first "pitless" digital dome planetarium in the United States. The dome is a 55-foot (16.8 m) perforated aluminum dome manufactured by Astro-tec Manufacturing Inc. The theater seats 190 and features individual interactive seat button controls. In September, 2018 the theater was closed due to renovations replacing the seats with new chairs. Designed around Evans & Sutherland's Digistar planetarium system, two super-high resolution projectors work together to blend a single seamless video stream over the entire dome. What results is an entirely new way to experience the universe, in 3 dimensions (no glasses required) with a resolution far beyond high definition video. The new system installed in 2011 can display 4096 X 4096 resolution and 60 frames per second.

A specially tuned 13,000 watt sound system with 5.1 surround sound and 21 speakers is installed behind the screen. Shows in this hemispherical theater cover a variety of space-related themes, from fully immersive 3D productions to live-narrated current events programs to family shows to music entertainment performance. Clark Planetarium Productions is one of the few informal science education institutions with the resources to create and distribute its own fulldome animation content.

Orbital ATK IMAX Theater
This planetarium features an IMAX certified big screen theater. The Northrop Grumman IMAX Theatre at Clark Planetarium emphasizes science and nature documentary programming. Shows feature both 3-D and 2-D films. A major renovation in November, 2010 modernized the theater with digital projectors, a new screen, new seats, and a new sound system.

Production
The Clark Planetarium Production Department is carrying on the 37-year tradition of the Hansen Planetarium by creating and distributing cutting edge content for planetariums worldwide. The production group creates its own digital dome cinema using a new 464-node render farm. Original full dome shows created by the Clark Planetarium production department include:
 Perfect Little Planet — Tour of the modern solar system (2012) in a fulldome 3-dimensional environment (i.e., 3-D without stereoscopic technology).
 Pink Floyd's Dark Side of the Moon - The Classic Laser Show reimagined with live laser technicians and trips graphics to give any fan a great trip to the Dark Side of the Moon.
 Pink Floyd's The Wall - The Planetarium plays The Wall only in October 
 Led Zeppelin — The most-demanded classic rock program (after Pink Floyd) in dome theaters since the 1970s.
 Attack of the Space Pirates — A science fiction action adventure show about the search for alien artifacts in our Milky Way galaxy, designed for all ages
 Gateway to the Stars — A live-narrated program about techniques for observing the night sky with the eye, binoculars and telescopes. Plays the first Saturday of every month, using deep sky objects currently visible at that time.
 Alternative-X — A music entertainment program featuring a variety of alternative rock, progressive rock and modern rock styles.
 Flight to the Moon: LRO and LCROSS — A mini-show about NASA's newest unmanned probes to the moon, the Lunar Reconnaissance Orbiter and the Lunar Crater Observation and Sensing Satellite.
 Extreme Planets — A tour of what earthlike extrasolar planets might look like, narrated by René Auberjonois
 The Secret of the Cardboard Rocket — Popular animated family show visiting the objects of our Solar System
 Saturn: Jewel of the Heavens — Fully immersive journey to Saturn through the eyes of the Cassini-Huygens space mission
 Sounds of the Underground – Techno and Club music light show featuring full-dome animation, laser beamwork and light effects
 Rock on Demand — Classic Rock themed music entertainment show, user-controlled "Jukebox" selection of music
 Night Vision — Current events and hot topics from the world of space and astronomy
 Dateline Mars — Live narrated production about the planet Mars and the latest images from spacecraft
 Black Holes — A 3D digital journey into the mystical and enigmatic Black Hole, narrated by John de Lancie
 Holiday Music Magic — Holiday music light show
 Ultimate Universe — A fulldome grand tour of the Universe, our Milky Way Galaxy, and Solar System

Exhibits
The Clark Planetarium features  of free exhibits including the newly installed "Science on a Sphere," a computer animation globe by NOAA.  Also unique is "Newton's Daydream", the most ambitious audio-kinetic sculpture ever created by artist George Rhoads.  Other popular exhibits include a Foucault pendulum, Earth Globe, Meteorites, Telescope displays, and updating video from the Hubble Space Telescope and NASA TV.  The Clark Planetarium is also one of the few institutions to have an authentic Moon rock sample on permanent loan from NASA.  This rock was obtained from the Apollo 15 mission and is displayed in a special exhibit showing the Apollo Moon landings and video footage of the astronauts collecting the displayed sample rock.  New exhibits are added on a regular basis, including a rocketry display by ATK Launch Systems of Utah, a Solar Energy exhibit, and "Weight on Other Worlds".

Education and public outreach
The education department at the planetarium serves over 75,000 school children a year through field trips and traveling science education programs throughout the state of Utah. Outreach programs include auditorium programs which showcase some of the best interactive science demonstrations possible. In-depth visits to 6th grades focus on aspects of their astronomy curriculum, and star parties provide opportunities to directly view many celestial objects. Topics include electricity, Newton's laws of motion, phases of the Moon, seasons, distance and scale, planets, the Solar System, and other science interest topics.

See also
 Old Hansen Planetarium

External links

 Clark Planetarium official website
 Show Sales

IMAX venues
Museums in Salt Lake City
Planetaria in the United States
Science museums in Utah
2003 establishments in Utah